Vissec (Languedocien: Virsec) is a commune in the Gard department in southern France.

Population

See also
 Château de Vissec
 Vis River
Communes of the Gard department

References

External links

  Vissec website

Communes of Gard